Bicyclus campus, the hill bush brown, is a butterfly in the family Nymphalidae. It is found in Guinea, Ivory Coast, Ghana, Togo, Benin, Nigeria, northern Cameroon, northern Angola, the Democratic Republic of the Congo, southern Sudan, Uganda, western Kenya and eastern Tanzania. The habitat consists of hilly terrain with forest/savanna mosaic.

References

Elymniini
Butterflies described in 1893
Butterflies of Africa